This is a collection of scientific, public opinion polls that have been conducted relating to the 2008 Russian presidential election.

Opinion polls by "Levada-center"
Sources: https://web.archive.org/web/20071130210431/http://www.levada.ru/vybory2008.html
Russia votes

First round

2004 polls

2005 polls

2006 polls

2007 polls

January-June

July-December

2008 polls

Second-round

Polls by FOM

2007 polls

2008 polls

Exit polls

References

Opinion
Presidential
Russia